U-22 may refer to one of the following German submarines:

 , was a Type U 19 submarine launched in 1913 and that served in the First World War until surrendered on 1 December 1918
 During the First World War, Germany also had these submarines with similar names:
 , a Type UB II submarine launched in 1915 and sunk 19 January 1918
 , a Type UC II submarine launched in 1916 and surrendered on 3 February 1919
 , a Type IIB submarine that served in the Second World War and went missing 27 March 1940
 , a Type 206 submarine of the Bundesmarine that was launched in 1974 and still in service

U-22 or U-XXII may also refer to:
 , a  submarine of the Austro-Hungarian Navy

See also
U22 (album) – a live album by Irish rock band U2
Beechcraft QU-22 Pave Eagle

Submarines of Germany